The West Sussex County Council election took place on 6 May 2021 alongside other local elections. All 70 seats to West Sussex County Council were elected. Labour gained 4 seats in the Worthing division, while the Green Party and Local Alliance gained their first ever seats on the council.

Summary

Election result

|-

Results by Division

Adur

Arun

Chichester

Crawley

Horsham

Mid Sussex

Worthing

By-elections

Bourne

Worthing West

Felpham

References 

West Sussex County Council elections
2021 English local elections
2020s in West Sussex